The Rivière Portneuf is a tributary of the north shore of the Saint-Laurent river, crossing the municipalities of Saint-Raymond, Pont-Rouge, Sant-Basile and Portneuf, in the Portneuf Regional County Municipality, in the administrative region of the Capitale-Nationale, in the province of Quebec, in Canada.

The Portneuf river valley is mainly served by route 138, chemin Neuf, chemin du rang Saint-Angélique, chemin du Grand Rang (route 365), chemin de Bourg-Louis, chemin de la Grande Ligne and chemin du Lac Sept-Îles-Sud.

Except for the segments passing through a hamlet of Saint-Raymond, in the village of Saint-Basile and in the village of Portneuf, agriculture and forestry constitute the main economic activities of the sector.

The surface of the Portneuf River (except the rapids areas) is generally frozen from the beginning of December to the end of March; safe circulation on the ice is generally done from the end of December to the beginning of March. The water level of the river varies with the seasons and the precipitation.

Geography 
The Portneuf River is located on the north shore of the Saint-Laurent river, halfway between Trois-Rivières and Quebec, more precisely between the hydrographic slopes the Sainte-Anne River (to the west) and the Jacques-Cartier River (to the east).

The Portneuf River draws its source from Sept Îles Lake which discharge from the southwest. The resort area is very dense around this lake.

Upper course of the Portneuf river (segment of )

  to the south by crossing the Lac-Sept-Îles road, in a valley initially encased between the mountains (whose summit reaches  at the east and another  to the west, crossing four small lakes, to the outlet (coming from the west) of two lakes, one of which includes Cantin beach;
  south-east passing north-east of Paquet Airport, crossing the Chemin de la Grande Ligne (route 367), to the outlet (from the northeast) of two small unidentified lakes;
  a priori towards the south in an agricultural zone, then towards the south-east bypassing a mountain whose summit reaches  and passing through Bourg-Louis (hamlet) where the course makes streamers, up to a bend in the river;
  to the southwest by crossing Bourg-Louis Falls, then by tracing streamers in the forest area; then branching south-east where the course crosses Chemin de la Traverse, to the outlet (coming from the north) of Lac Sergent;

Intermediate course of the Portneuf river (segment of )

  towards the south-east, winding up to the confluence of the Blanche River (coming from the north);
  towards the south-east by collecting a stream (coming from the north-east), crossing a long series of rapids and forming a loop towards the south-east at the end of the segment, until boulevard Nord-Dame (route 365);
  towards the south-west by winding intermittently by collecting the Morasse stream (coming from the north), until the outlet of the Saint-Jacques River (coming from the northeast);

Lower course of the Portneuf river (segment of )

  forming a large S, up to the confluence of the Rivière des Sept Îles (coming from the northwest);
  to the southwest by forming a first loop to the north, bypassing the village of Saint-Basile-Sud to the east and south and crossing the boulevard du Centenaire, until 'at the confluence of the Chaude River (Portneuf River) (coming from the north-west);
  towards the southwest by forming a hook towards the west, then a second towards the east, passing under the Bishop bridge, collecting the stream from rang Saint-Charles (coming from the west) and the brook at Jess's (coming from the west), then passing through Portneuf-Station and Portneuf, cutting highway 40, route 138 and the path of iron to its mouth.

Some infrastructures have been erected in this hydrographic slope notably mills (saw and flour) and shipyards (in the lower zone). Two disused dams are listed in the municipalities of Portneuf and Notre-Dame-de-Portneuf.

A quay of one km in length, was built on the Saint-Laurent river during the years 1956 to 1958 by the city of Portneuf west of the mouth of the Portneuf river. This Portneuf wharf points southeast toward Pointe-Platon (Lotbinière Regional County Municipality), located on the south shore of the St. Lawrence River. This quay is a gathering place for local festivities.

Toponymy 
The name of this river is linked to the seigniory of Portneuf which it crosses before flowing into the Saint Lawrence river. Although this seigniory was allotted in 1636, the act of the concession was confirmed in 1647.

The toponym "Rivière Portneuf" was formalized on December 5, 1968, at the Place Names Bank of the Commission de toponymie du Québec.

See also

 List of rivers of Quebec

References 

Rivers of Capitale-Nationale
Tributaries of the Saint Lawrence River